Tenellia georgiana is a species of sea slug, an aeolid nudibranch, a marine gastropod mollusc in the family Fionidae.

Distribution
This species was described from South Georgia, Antarctica. It is reported from the Ross Sea, Kerguelen, South Georgia and southern Chile.

References 

Fionidae
Gastropods described in 1886